The 2012 SEC women's basketball tournament took place at the Bridgestone Arena in Nashville, Tennessee from March 1–4, 2012. The Tennessee Lady Volunteers won the tournament and received the SEC's automatic bid to the 2012 NCAA women's basketball tournament by defeating the LSU Lady Tigers 70–58 in the championship game.

Bracket

All-tournament team 
Glory Johnson, UT (MVP) 
Shekinna Stricklen, UT 
A’dia Mathies, UK 
Keyla Snowden, UK 
LaSondra Barrett, LSU 
Adrienne Webb, LSU

References

SEC women's basketball tournament
Basketball competitions in Nashville, Tennessee
Women's sports in Tennessee
College sports tournaments in Tennessee
2012 in sports in Tennessee